Simón de Anda y Salazar (28 October 1709 – 30 October 1776) was a Spanish Basque governor of the Philippines from July 1770 to 30 October 1776.

Oidor at the Royal Audience of Manila and Lieutenant Governor
De Anda y Salazar was an Oidor of the Royal Audience of Manila, who was appointed as Lieutenant Governor of the city by the Governor-General of the Philippines and the Audiencia itself during the British occupation of Manila. He departed Manila on the night of 5 October 1762, during the Battle of Manila (1762), and established a Spanish provisional colonial government and army in Bulacan. The acting governor of Manila, Archbishop Manuel Rojo, was captured by the British and surrendered the Philippines, but this act was rejected as illegal by Anda.

Resistance
Anda escaped from Manila with much of the treasury and documents, assumed full authority on behalf of the Real Audiencia of Manila, established the provisional government and raised an army in Bulacan (later Pampanga), and re-continued the military campaign against the British. All early negotiations between him and the British forces in Manila proved unsuccessful, as he returned unopened all letters sent to him that did not address him as the Governor-General of the Philippines, something that the British refused to do until the death of Archbishop Rojo on 30 January 1764.

In March 1764, orders were brought from both the King of Britain and the King of Spain by the Spanish governor designate Brigadier Don Francisco de la Torre, requiring the handover of the city to Spain in accordance with the 1763 Treaty of  Paris. British Governor Drake was charged with culpability as governor but forestalled an adverse finding by resigning and leaving the Philippines on 29 March 1764.  The Manila Council elected Alexander Dalrymple as governor on the same day, but the Manila garrison would not obey him.  On 1 April 1764 the Manila garrison ceremonially marched out, embarking for home, and giving the Spanish control of Manila with de la Torre as Governor and Captain-General of the Spanish Philippines.

Governor-General  of the Philippines
Anda traveled to Spain, and was well received by the Cortes Generales (parliament), and made Councilor of Castile by the King, in spite of having written a letter to him complaining of certain disorders in the Philippines, enumerating among them a number against the friars.

On 12 April 1768 he returned to the Philippines and by Royal Decree became Governor-General in July 1770. He proceeded against his predecessor, and other politicians, and roused the opposition and reformed the Spanish and Philippine army, and engaged in other public works. He opposed the king's order of 9 November 1774, to secularize the curacies held by regulars. After his death, the order was repealed on 11 December 1776.

De Anda y Salazar died on 30 October 1776, in the Hospital de San Felipe, in Cavite at the age of 67 years.

Legacy

A monument to his legacy was erected on Bonifacio Drive in Manila, and the municipalities of San Simon in Pampanga, Anda in Bohol and Anda in Pangasinan were named after him. A street has also been named after him in the Basque capital of Vitoria, close to his natal town of Subijana.

See also 
 British occupation of Manila
 Royal Audience of Manila
 History of the Philippines

References

External links

Spanish governors of the Philippines

1701 births
1776 deaths
People from Álava
Captains General of the Philippines
Spanish East Indies
18th-century Spanish people